Ghorabari is a taluka part of Thatta District. It has a population of 174,046, and an area of 1018 square kilometres.

Khathore and Hayat Gaho forests in Ghorabari are expected to be the site of 3000 acres of palm oil tree cultivation by 2025 by the Sindh Coastal Development Authority.

References

Thatta District